This is a list of information theory topics, by Wikipedia page.
 A Mathematical Theory of Communication
 algorithmic information theory
 arithmetic coding
 channel capacity
 Communication Theory of Secrecy Systems
 conditional entropy
 conditional quantum entropy
 confusion and diffusion
 cross entropy
 data compression
 entropic uncertainty (Hirchman uncertainty)
 entropy encoding
 entropy (information theory)
 Fisher information
 Hick's law
 Huffman coding
 information bottleneck method
 information theoretic security
 information theory
 joint entropy
 Kullback–Leibler divergence
 lossless compression
 negentropy
 noisy-channel coding theorem (Shannon's theorem)
 principle of maximum entropy
 quantum information science
 range encoding
 redundancy (information theory)
 Rényi entropy
 self-information
 Shannon–Hartley theorem

Information theory
Information theory topics